The 1912 Detroit Tigers season was a season in American baseball. It involved the Tigers finishing sixth in the American League. It was the team's first season in Tiger Stadium.

Regular season 
On April 20, 1912, Navin Field opened the same day as Fenway Park. It was supposed to be opened on April 18 (like Fenway Park) but it rained in both cities on that day. Ty Cobb scored the first run in Tiger Stadium by stealing home.

On May 18, 1912, the Tigers players went on strike to protest the suspension of star center fielder Ty Cobb, who had gone into the stands on May 15 to attack a disabled fan who had been abusing him. Rather than forfeit the next game, the Tigers sent out a team of replacement players, mostly local college and sandlot players but also including Tigers coaches Joe Sugden and 48-year-old Deacon McGuire. Manager Hughie Jennings also entered the game as a pinch hitter. Starting pitcher Allan Travers gave up 24 runs on 26 hits in a complete game loss, both American League records.

On July 4, 1912, George Mullin threw the first no-hitter in Detroit Tigers history. The Tigers beat the St. Louis Browns by a score of 7–0. It was also Mullin's 32nd birthday.

Season standings

Record vs. opponents

Notable transactions 
 August 26, 1912: Willie Jensen was purchased by the Tigers from the New Haven Murlins.

Roster

Player stats

Batting

Starters by position 
Note: Pos = Position; G = Games played; AB = At bats; H = Hits; Avg. = Batting average; HR = Home runs; RBI = Runs batted in

Other batters 
Note: G = Games played; AB = At bats; H = Hits; Avg. = Batting average; HR = Home runs; RBI = Runs batted in

Pitching

Starting pitchers 
Note: G = Games pitched; IP = Innings pitched; W = Wins; L = Losses; ERA = Earned run average; SO = Strikeouts

Other pitchers 
Note: G = Games pitched; IP = Innings pitched; W = Wins; L = Losses; ERA = Earned run average; SO = Strikeouts

Relief pitchers 
Note: G = Games pitched; W = Wins; L = Losses; SV = Saves; ERA = Earned run average; SO = Strikeouts

References

External links

1912 Detroit Tigers season at Baseball Reference

Detroit Tigers seasons
Detroit Tigers season
Detroit Tigers
1912 in Detroit